John Guille (born 23 May 1949) is a Church of England priest. He was Dean of Southwell from 2007 until 2014.

Early life
Guille was born on 23 May 1949. He was educated at Guernsey Grammar School, then an all-boys grammar school in Guernsey. He had a brief career as a teacher.

Ordained ministry
Guille was ordained in 1977. He was a Curate at Chandler's Ford then Priest in charge of St John, Bournemouth and after that Rector of  St André de la Pommeraye, Guernsey. He was Archdeacon of Basingstoke then Winchester (the same job renamed) and a Canon Residentiary at its cathedral until his elevation to the Deanery. He served as Dean of Southwell from 2007 until his retirement on 30 June 2014.

References

1949 births
Guernsey people
Living people
Archdeacons of Basingstoke
Archdeacons of Winchester
Provosts and Deans of Southwell